Merișani may refer to several places in Romania:

 Merișani, a commune in Argeș County
 Merișani, a village in Băbăița Commune, Teleorman County
 Merișani, a village in Dobroteşti Commune, Teleorman County

See also 
 Măru (disambiguation)
 Merești (disambiguation)
 Merișor (disambiguation)
 Merișoru (disambiguation)